The Kurdish National Alliance in Syria (HNKS) is a Syrian Kurdish coalition formed by five Syrian Kurdish parties in the city of Amuda in the al-Hasakah Governorate of northeastern Syria in 13 February 2016. Four of the five parties in the coalition were originally members of the Kurdish National Council, but were expelled due to their cooperation with the Democratic Union Party (PYD).

Constituent parties

History

The Kurdish National Alliance in Syria was founded on 14 February 2016 after 2 days of negotiations between the constituent groups. It stated its goal as to "get rid of Kurdish fragmentation". 39 representatives were elected during the conference.

In January 2017, the HNKS stated that it will support proposals of unity talks between the Movement for a Democratic Society and the KNC.

The HNKS also took part in the Northern Syria regional elections in December 2017, during which it was one of the two main electoral lists, opposing the PYD-led Democratic Nation List. It ran with 99 candidates for the Jazira Region, with 124 candidates for the Euphrates Region, and with 197 candidates in the Afrin Region. The HNKS consequently won 40 seats in Jazira Region, 40 seats in Euphrates Region, and 72 seats in Afrin Region.

In early March 2018, during the Turkish military operation against the Afrin Region, Turkish-backed Sunni Islamist fighters captured the village of Sharran and burned a flag of the HNKS's Kurdish Democratic Unity Party in Syria (PYDKS) in its vacant office.

Ideology

The Kurdish National Alliance supports Rojava and considers federalism in Syria as the most effective solution to the Syrian Civil War. It claims that its objective is to "stress the necessity of unifying the Kurdish ranks in the face of the current challenges". In addition, it listed 4 recommendations during its formation:
Approving the national identity of the Kurdish people in Syria
Listing the Kurdish language as an official language in the constitution of Syria
Granting full women's rights in the process of the "development of society"
Activating the role of intellectuals and independent social and national figures

See also
List of political parties in Rojava

External links
Facebook page of the Kurdish National Alliance in Syria
Website of the HNKS's Kurdish Democratic Unity Party in Syria (PYDKS)

References

2016 establishments in Syria
Federalist parties in Syria
Kurdish nationalism in Syria
Kurdish nationalist political parties
Kurdish political parties in Syria
Kurdish political party alliances
Political parties established in 2016
Political party alliances in Syria
Politics of the Autonomous Administration of North and East Syria
Syrian democracy movements
Syrian opposition